Stanislav Moša (born 12 February 1956 in Nový Jičín) is a Czech theatre and musical director, manager, lyricist and librettist. Since 1992, he has been the artistic director and manager of the Brno City Theatre.

He studied in Ostrava and in Brno at JAMU. He directed over 120 productions abroad as well as in the Czech Republic (as of 2008).

Drama directing 
 Romeo and Juliet
 The Good Soldier Švejk
 Manon Lescaut

Musical directing 
 West Side Story
 Jesus Christ Superstar
 Joseph and the Amazing Technicolor Dreamcoat
 The Witches of Eastwick (musical)
 My Fair Lady

References

External links
 (cs) Stanislav Moša on www.mdb.cz

1956 births
Living people
Czech theatre directors
People from Nový Jičín